The 1801 United States Senate special election in Pennsylvania was held on December 17, 1801. George Logan was elected by the Pennsylvania General Assembly to the United States Senate.

Background
The Democratic-Republican Peter Muhlenberg was elected to the United States Senate by the Pennsylvania General Assembly, consisting of the House of Representatives and the Senate, in February 1801. Sen. Muhlenberg resigned on June 30, 1801, after being appointed supervisor of revenue for Pennsylvania by President Thomas Jefferson.

Results
Following the resignation of Sen. Peter Muhlenberg, the Pennsylvania General Assembly convened on December 17, 1801, to elect a new Senator to fill the vacancy. The results of the vote of both houses combined are as follows:

|-
|-bgcolor="#EEEEEE"
| colspan="3" align="right" | Totals
| align="right" | 111
| align="right" | 100.00%
|}

References

External links
Pennsylvania Election Statistics: 1682-2006 from the Wilkes University Election Statistics Project

1801 special
Pennsylvania 1801
Pennsylvania special
United States Senate special
United States Senate 1801 special
Pennsylvania 1801